The black-tailed dasyure (Murexia melanurus) is a species of marsupial in the family Dasyuridae.

Range and habitat
The Black-tailed dasyure is native to New Guinea, where it ranges across the Central Cordillera of Western New Guinea, which is part of Indonesia, and of Papua New Guinea. It is also present in the Arfak Mountains of Western New Guinea and the Torricelli Mountains in northern Papua New Guinea. It is found from sea level to mid-montane areas up to 2,800 meters elevation.

Its natural habitat is forest, including lowland rain forest and montane rain forest (mid-montane forest, beech forest, pandanus forest, and mossy forest).

It is fairly abundant across its range, and its population is stable.

Breeding
The Black-tailed dasyure breeds throughout the year. Females have up to four young.

References

External links
Scientists discover new species with fatal attraction on Queensland's Gold Coast hinterland—Australian Broadcasting Corporation (Wednesday, 19 February 2014)

Dasyuromorphs
Mammals described in 1899
Taxa named by Oldfield Thomas
Taxonomy articles created by Polbot
Marsupials of New Guinea